The Nordkette Cable Car in  the Austrian state of Tyrol is a gondola lift from Innsbruck to the Nordkette, the southernmost mountain chain of the Karwendel.

It runs in two sections from the Innsbruck quarter of Hungerburg via Seegrube Station to the top station, Hafelekar. The cableway is the heart of the Innsbrucker Nordkettenbahnen ski area.

Literature 
 .
 Roland Kubanda (Hrsg.): Stadtflucht 10 m/s. Innsbruck und die Nordkettenbahn. Beiträge zum 75-Jahr-Jubiläum. Studien Verlag, Innsbruck 2003, Veröffentlichungen des Innsbrucker Stadtarchivs, 352 S., Gebunden, .

External links 

Nordkette Cable Car website
, Wiener Zeitung, 12 September 2003
 www.nordkette-austria.net - The Nordkette in the Karwendel
 Die Nordkettenbahn in Innsbruck - Information by the Austrian Federal Monument Office about its Renovation
 The Nordkette Singletrail

References 

1920s architecture
Cable cars in Austria
Ski areas in Austria
Transport in Tyrol (state)
Karwendel
Organisations based in Innsbruck
1920s establishments in Austria
20th-century architecture in Austria